Maximiliane Rall (born 18 November 1993) is a German footballer who plays as a defender for Bayern München and the Germany women's national team.

Career
Rall made her international debut for Germany on 10 November 2018, starting in a friendly match against Italy. The home match finished as a 5–2 win for Germany.

Career statistics

International

References

External links
 
 
 
 

1993 births
Living people
People from Rottweil
Sportspeople from Freiburg (region)
Footballers from Baden-Württemberg
German women's footballers
Germany women's international footballers
Women's association football defenders
TSG 1899 Hoffenheim (women) players
FC Bayern Munich (women) players
Frauen-Bundesliga players
2. Frauen-Bundesliga players